Frank L. Hope & Associates, later known as the Hope Consulting Group and then the Hope Design Group was an architecture firm based in San Diego, California. It known for designing San Diego Stadium, later as known as Jack Murphy Stadium and now SDCCU Stadium, which was awarded by the American Institute of Architects, as well as the First National Bank building in downtown San Diego, facilities at the University of California, San Diego, San Diego City College and others. It was the oldest architectural firm in San Diego, with satellite offices in San Francisco and Saudi Arabia.

History
Frank Hope Sr. founded Frank L. Hope & Associates in 1928. Prior to establishing the firm, Hope attended (but did not graduate from) the University of California, Berkeley and the Carnegie Institute of Architecture, was employed in the design department of a ship builder during World War I, then worked for the architectural firm of Requa & Jackson.

Frank L. Hope & Associates designed houses and churches in a Mediterranean style, which he learned while at Requa & Jackson. These buildings included the Our Lady of Guadalupe Catholic Church in San Diego and the Carmelite Monastery located in Normal Heights, San Diego.

The firm later designed houses in the seaside community of Point Loma, San Diego in the Streamline Moderne style. The largest structure designed during Frank Hope Sr.'s tenure was the Great Western Building (then known as the Home Tower), built in 1962. He retired in 1966, turning the reins over to his sons, architect Frank Hope Jr. (who would be named Fellow of the American Institute of Architects, awarded to about two percent of the AIA's membership for national architectural contributions) and structural engineer Chuck Hope.

The most notable structure designed by Frank L. Hope & Associates is San Diego Stadium, later as known as Jack Murphy Stadium and Qualcomm Stadium. Though it was a controversial structure, the stadium was awarded with an AIA National Honor Award for its Brutalist architecture design when it opened (the only other building in San Diego with the same honor is the Salk Institute for Biological Studies), and another in 1982 it was given a special Award of Honor by the AIA. Hope secured the contract at age 35 with no background in the design of stadiums. Gary Allen is acknowledged as the design architect of the stadium.

The firm designed buildings that are part of San Diego's downtown skyline during the city's boom in the '70s to '80s, including the east tower of the waterfront Marriott Hotel adjacent to the San Diego Convention Center and the First National Bank building. (Both buildings were designed by C.W. Kim, who later opened his own architectural firm.)  It also designed the headquarters of The San Diego Union-Tribune in Mission Valley, San Diego.

In the '90s, management and ownership of the company tranisitoned to architect F. Lee Hope (Frank Hope Jr.'s son) and civil engineer Chuck Hope Jr. (and Chuck Hope's son). However, the decade saw the company, now known as the Hope Design Group, facing increasing competition from firms outside of its home base of San Diego and outside San Diego for projects in the city. It was forced to cut its workforce. The company closed its doors in 1993.

Selected projects
 San Diego Stadium
 Aquarium Museum Building, Scripps Institution of Oceanography
 Carmelite Monastery of San Diego
 Coronado Hospital
 Dana Middle School
 First National Bank building
 Home Tower
 Immaculate Conception Church, San Diego
 Marriott Hotel (East Tower), San Diego
 McGill Hall (Psychology Building), John Muir College Campus, University of California, San Diego
 Scripps Mercy Hospital, San Diego
 Sharp Mesa Vista Hospital, San Diego
 The San Diego Union-Tribune
 San Diego City College
 Timken Museum of Art
 Travelodge Headquarters, San Diego

References

Defunct architecture firms based in California
Companies based in San Diego